"Always and Forever" is an R&B song written by Rod Temperton and produced by Barry Blue. It was first recorded by the British-based multinational funk-disco band Heatwave in 1976. Released as a single on December 3, 1977, the song is included on Heatwave's debut album Too Hot to Handle (1976) and has been covered by numerous artists, becoming something of a standard.

The song reached number 18 on the US Billboard Hot 100 in March 1978 after peaking at number two on the US Billboard R&B chart, the band's highest showing on that tally. The single was certified platinum by the RIAA on September 6, 2001. In the UK, the songs "Too Hot to Handle" and "The Groove Line" were released before a double A-sided "Always and Forever" / "Mind Blowing Decisions" was issued in November 1978. This became the band's second top-10 hit on the UK Singles Chart when it spent two weeks at number nine in December.

Heatwave version
After the international success of Heatwave's disco single "Boogie Nights", "Always and Forever" was chosen as the U.S. follow-up single in late 1977. A ballad featuring lead vocals by Johnnie Wilder, Jr., "Always and Forever" stood out among the band's predominantly disco repertoire and became a successful U.S. hit song in early 1978.

In the late 1970s through to the 1980s, it was a popular "slow dance" song at high school proms, weddings, particularly in inner-city areas with a high minority population. The song was also played during the slow dance scene in the movie House Party.

In the liner notes to Heatwave's 1996 compilation album, The Best of Heatwave: Always and Forever, music writer and former Billboard contributor Brian Chin notes that Wilder
says that it was right around the time of the single release of "Always and Forever" that he knew Heatwave's music would stand the test of time. This pop standard is emblematic of the Heatwave fusion of influences - R&B, teen romance, and both European and American flavors of pop.
AllMusic reviewer Craig Lytle states that the song "was and continues to be an ageless piece. Johnnie Wilder's vocal exhibition throughout the vamp is breathtaking."

In 2009, Essence magazine included the song in their list of the "25 Best Slow Jams of All Time".

Charts

Weekly charts

Year-end charts

Luther Vandross version

American R&B/soul singer-songwriter Luther Vandross released his cover of "Always and Forever" as the second single from his ninth album, Songs (1994). His recording earned him a Grammy Award nomination in the category Best Male R&B Vocal performance at the Grammy Awards of 1995 and placed on four US Billboard charts, with its best showing on the R&B chart, where it reached number 16. Vandross's single made the Hot 100 at number 58 and also appeared on Billboards adult contemporary and rhythmic top 40 charts.

Critical reception
Larry Flick from Billboard described the song as "a faithful rendition of a romantic standard". He added, "Layered with glorious strings and the golden input of producer Walter Afanasieff, single has the potential to go where his "Endless Love" duet with Mariah Carey did not–right to the top of the Hot 100. His voice has rarely fit so well with a song intended for pop radio consumption." Steve Baltin from Cash Box stated, "Despite the challenge of young guns on the r&b charts and big-name stars on the pop charts, Luther’s new album Songs, made up of covers, has been a big crossover hit. [...] This remake of an r&b classic should keep the fire burning, as Vandross gives the song the treatment, exploding at the climax. Big on A.C. and urban, with some top 40 appeal." In his weekly UK chart commentary, James Masterton felt that "it never was the most exciting of records and Luther does little to add to this."

Track listing
 US, UK - CD single
"Always and Forever" (Radio Edit) - 4:00
"Searching" - 8:02
"The Glow of Love" - 6:11
"Always and Forever" (Live) - 5:03

Charts

Other significant cover versions
Among many artists who have recorded versions of "Always and Forever" is the American R&B vocal group Whistle, who released their single in 1990 from their album of the same name. Their take on the song made the top 10 on the Billboard R&B chart, peaking at number nine, while also cracking the top 40 of the Hot 100 at #35.

American pop singer Johnny Mathis recorded the song for his 2008 compilation album, A Night to Remember.

References

External links
Heatwave US 7-inch single Discogs
Heatwave UK 12-inch single Discogs
Whistle US 12-inch single Discogs
Luther Vandross UK CD single Discogs

1970s ballads
1976 songs
1977 singles
1990 singles
1994 singles
Epic Records singles
GTO Records singles
Heatwave (band) songs
Luther Vandross songs
Pop ballads
Rhythm and blues ballads
Song recordings produced by Walter Afanasieff
Songs written by Rod Temperton
Soul ballads